Volleyball at the 2005 Southeast Asian Games consisted of indoor volleyball held at the West Negros University Gymnasium in Bacolod, Negros Occidental, Philippines and beach volleyball held at the University of St. La Salle Grounds also in Bacolod.

Volleyball at the SEA Games was split into two categories: the traditional volleyball competition and beach volleyball.

Medal winners

Details

Indoor Volleyball

Men's Finals

Women's Finals

Beach Volleyball

Men's Finals

Women's Finals

External links
Southeast Asian Games Official Results

2005 Southeast Asian Games events
2005 in volleyball
Volleyball at the Southeast Asian Games